Bhatli is a town in Bargarh district, Odisha.

Geography
Bhatli is located in Western Odisha, close to the border of neighbouring state of Chhattisgarh. The whole of Bargarh district lies in the Deccan plateau with Eastern Ghats running close to the town. As per the earthquake zoning of India, Bhatli falls in the zone 2 category, the least earthquake prone zone.

Educational institute
Dadhibaman College, Bhatli (Affiliated to Sambalpur University). It is the only college of the town.

Boys High School for Boys.

Satihari Girls School for girls.

Nivedita Public School (CBSE)

Saraswati Sishu Vidya Mandir

Economy
Major employment source of people are agricultural activities. A significant population of the weaver community is engaged in Handloom activities, producing famous sambalpuri saree. A small section of the population is dependent on trade. In terms of industry, this area is yet to attend its full potential.

Health services
State Government Community Health Centre is providing primary health service to this area. Dr Rajesh Chandra Padhi is the medical officer of the community health centre. CHC Bhatli got a commendation award by the state government in Kayakalpa activities, only CHC got this award in the district of Bargarh in 2019.And again continuously in 2020,2021 and 2022. Navjeeban Chikistalaya, headed by Dr Sunil Acharya, is the only private hospital serving the Bhatli locality. NGO like Abhyudaya are working for sustainable health care by alternative remedies. These organizations creates awareness on harmful effects of chemical farming, poisoned food systems and water.

Festivals

Ratha-Yatra
Every year Ratha-Yatra is celebrated in the Dadhubamana Temple in accordance with Jagannath Temple Ratha-Yatra in Puri. It is not only famous in the whole Bargarh District, but also in entire western odisha. Local devotee comes with enthusiasm and pay tribute by pulling the ratha to the Rathadanda Padia. Bhatli is also known as Srikhetera of paschim odisha. To witness the Ratha Yatra devotees comes in large numbers. On the 10th day the Bahuda Yatra is also celebrated, again in accordance with Ratha Yatra in Puri.

Phalguna Mela
This is one type of carnivals of religious nature. It is celebrated by the Marwadi community from the local area in the Shyam temple. The most important festival associated with the temple is the Phalguna Mela, which occurs just 8–9 days before the festival of Holi. Barbarika's head appeared on Phalguna Shuddha Ekadashi, the 11th day of the bright half of the Hindu month of Phalguna. Therefore, the fair is held from the 9th to the 12th of that month. The fair has now been extended to nearly 12–15 days of the bright half of the Phalguna Month.

Khatushyamji Rath idol during Pad Yatra from Temple to road nearby up to some distance.
On this holy occasion pilgrims all over the country come here on foot with nishaans (holy mark - flags) in their hands. People enjoy their holy journey by singing shyam bhajans and playing various musical instruments. They enjoy the journey by playing holi with gulal. Many Shyam Bhaktas supply food to pedestrians in the shade of tents. They encourage also to complete their journey with full enthusiasm. They enjoy this occasion as the marriage of Khatushyamji. People enjoy the mela by purchasing various things. On Dwadashi (= 12th day of month), Bhog is being prepared as Baba's Prasadi of Kheer, Churama.

Gobardhan Puja
Also This area is famous for the giri Gobardhan Puja of KUISIRA Village.

Administration
Bhatli is one of the block of 314 developmental blocks of Odisha. It is a tehsil. It is a constituent assembly for Odisha Legislative Assembly, Bhatli Constituency. It is also a Gram Panchayat of Panchayati Raj Institution of the tier 3 governance pattern of India. Its district headquarters is in Bargarh.

Odisha Legislative Assembly
Bhatli Constituency
Current MLA is Susanta Singh

Community Development Block
It is the block headquarter of 84 villages.

List of villages

 Amlipali 
 Badamlipali 
 Badapali
 Badmal 
 Banjipali 
 Baratunda 
 Baulsingha 
 Beherapali 
 Bhadigoan 
 Bhatli
 Bhinjetora
 Bhojpuri 
 Bichhuan 
 Bisalpali 
 Chadeigan 
 Chorgrindola
 Dablang 
 Deultunda 
 Dumalpali 
 Gaurgaon 
 Gopalpur 
 Gourpali 
 Haladipali 
 Halanda 
 Halupali 
 Harasankri 
 Hatisar 
 Jadamunda 
 Jagatipali 
 Jampali 
 Jara 
 Jaypur
 Jhankarpali 
 Jharmunda 
 Jhikjhiki 
 Kahenmunda 
 Kamgoan 
 Kanakbira 
 Kandiapali
 Karlajori 
 Karlakhai 
 Kasipali 
 Kelendapali 
 Kenduguria 
 Kesaipali 
 Khajuria 
 Khaliapali 
 Kharmora 
 Kharsal 
 Khirat 
 Kuisira 
 Kultapali
 Kushanpuri 
 Latipali 
 Mahada 
 Mahulpali 
 Mendhapali 
 Mulbar 
 Murumkel 
 Nalichuan 
 Narangapur 
 Nilji 
 Nuagarh 
 Pandakipali 
 Pandaritarai 
 Raisobha 
 Rautpada 
 Runipali 
 Rusipali 
 Samardarha 
 Saradhapali 
 Sirabahal 
 Sirapali 
 Sukuda 
 Sukudadanbirti
 Sulusulia 
 Tala 
 Talpali 
 Tarakana 
 Tejagula 
 Temren 
 Tukurla 
 Udhaipali 
 Urdduna

Tehsil

Gram Panchayat

Communication
Bhatli is only 18 km by road from the district headquarter and well connected by state highway.

Temple

Dadhibaman temple
It is a temple of god dadhibaman, incarnation of lord Vishnu.

BhatliShyam Temple
It is temple of Baba Shyam. It is second in all in India of its type.

Jagannath temple KUISIRA

Place of Attraction
Near to Bhatli is Debrigarh Wildlife Sanctuary.
And Giri Govardhan park KUISIRA

References

Cities and towns in Bargarh district